Nogometno društvo Črnuče, commonly referred to as ND Črnuče or simply Črnuče, is a Slovenian football club from the town of Črnuče, founded in 1971. Their golden years came in the mid-1990s, when they were managed by Branko Oblak, who came to Črnuče as manager in 1994. They have won the Slovenian Third League and finished third in the 1995–96 Slovenian Second League, but then refused promotion. They merged with nearby NK Factor in 1997 and the team moved to Factor's home ground in Ježica. Črnuče then reestablished their own squad to play at domestic Črnuče Sports Park in lower divisions, but they never came higher than fourth level.

League results

Honours
Slovenian Third League
Winners: 1994–95

Slovenian Fourth Division
Winners: 1993–94

MNZ Ljubljana Cup
Winners: 1994–95

References

External links
Official website 

Association football clubs established in 1971
Football clubs in Slovenia
1971 establishments in Slovenia